Bryan Bowers is an American autoharp player who is frequently credited with introducing the instrument to new generations of musicians.

Career

Bowers became very popular with the audience of the comedy radio program The Dr. Demento Show with his 1980 recording of Mike Cross' song "The Scotsman". In 1993, Bowers was inducted into the Autoharp Hall of Fame whose membership includes Mother Maybelle Carter, Kilby Snow, and Sara Carter.

In two consecutive years, 2006 and 2007, he released new recordings: Bristlecone Pine and September in Alaska. "Although such guests as Tim O'Brien, Sam Bush, Stuart Duncan, and Enright and O'Bryant play and sing on a number of cuts, this is a Bryan Bowers disc all the way, with his exquisite autoharp flavoring many of the tunes," wrote a November 2006 Bluegrass Unlimited reviewer of Bristlecone Pine. "Bowers selects thematically diverse and lyrically strong material. There are powerful love songs ("When You And I Were True" and "Magnolia") and non-cloying meditations on life and death ("Bristlecone Pine," "Friend For Life," and "When I Go"), as well as haunting instrumentals. He nicely avoids the hackneyed stuff of so many folk/bluegrass/country performers." He maintains an active performance and teaching schedule.

Awards
Contemporary Inductee, Autoharp Hall of Fame, 1993.
Lifetime Achievement Award, California Autoharp Gathering, 2006.
Induction into Frets Magazine's First Gallery of the Greats

Select discography

The View from Home, Flying Fish, 1977
Home, Home on the Road, Flying Fish, 1980
By Heart, Flying Fish, 1982
For You, Flying Fish, 1990
Friend for Life, Flying Fish, 2002
Bristlecone Pine, Seattle Sounds, 2006
September in Alaska, Seattle Sounds, 2007
Crabby Old Man, 2011
Live at Winterfolk, 2015
Woodland Dream, 2019

References

External links
www.bryanbowers.com
Bryan Bowers management
Home Page for Bryan Bowers

American autoharp players
Living people
20th-century American musicians
21st-century American musicians
Flying Fish Records artists